Chief Oladipo "Ladi" Jadesimi is a Nigerian oil businessman and founder of the Lagos Deep Offshore Logistics Base, where he serves as the executive chairman.

Education and career 
Oladipo Jadesimi completed his secondary school education at King's College, Lagos. He graduated from Oxford University in 1966 with M.A. and L.L.B. degrees in Jurisprudence, and began working as a chartered accountant with Coopers and Lybrand in London. He is a Fellow of the Institute of Chartered Accountants in England and Wales (F.C.A.). He is a founding partner in Arthur Andersen Nigeria, where he serves as an Independent Financial Consultant, and a major investor in the Niger Delta Oil Company. He was appointed the director of Niger Delta Exploration and Production PLC in 2010 and became Chairman of the Board on June 21, 2016. He served as a non-executive director of First City Monument Bank from 1983 until 2011. Jadesimi is a founder of Lagos Offshore Logistics Base and serves as the executive chairman.

Personal life
Chief Jadesimi is married to Alero Okotie-Eboh, a broadcaster and daughter of Chief Festus Okotie-Eboh. Their daughter, Amy Jadesimi, is the chief executive officer of LADOL. Jadesimi had an affair with the English socialite Suzanna McQuiston while working as an accountant in London in the 1980s. Through this relationship, he fathered Emma Thynn, Marchioness of Bath.

References 

Living people
20th-century Nigerian businesspeople
21st-century Nigerian businesspeople
Businesspeople from Lagos
Coopers and Lybrand people
Oladipo
Nigerian billionaires
Nigerian business executives
Nigerian company founders
Nigerian businesspeople in the oil industry
Alumni of the University of Oxford
Yoruba businesspeople
Nigerian accountants
Year of birth missing (living people)
Nigerian chairpersons of corporations
King's College, Lagos alumni